The Official Gazette is a weekly publication issued by the Ministry of Legal Affairs in pursuance of the Law of the Official Gazette issued by Royal Decree 84/2011.

History 

The Official Gazette was first established by Law No. 3/72 which stipulated the release of the Official Gazette on Thursday of every week. This law was later repealed by Law No. 4/73 which stipulated the release of the Official Gazette on bi-weekly basis. The 72 law was consequently repealed by Royal Decree 84/2011 which issued the new Law of the Official Gazette which stipulated that the Official Gazette is to be published on the first working day of every week as long as there is proper content for the Gazette to publish.

The first issue of the Official Gazette was issued on Thursday 27 April 1972.

Contents 

According to Article 3 of the Law of the Official Gazette, the Gazette shall publish the following:

Laws
Royal decrees
Treaties and international agreements that Oman enters into after their ratification
Royal orders and decisions
Regulations
Ministerial decisions and other administrative decisions issued by administrative bodies of the state and which are required to be published
Other material to be published in accordance with the laws and royal decrees
Any other matter needed to be published for the public interest

Language 
The Official Gazette is currently only published in Arabic, but Article 4 of the most recent Law of the Official Gazette authorizes the Minister of Legal Affairs to order to have it published in Arabic and English.

Method of Distribution 

The Official Gazette is only available in print form. The index of each issue is usually published in electronic format on the website of the Ministry of Legal Affairs.

References

External links 

 

Communications in Oman
Government gazettes
1972 establishments in Oman
Publications established in 1972